Islam in the Cayman Islands is a minority religion.

History
Muslims have been living on the islands since early 1980s. Jumu'ah were held in one of the Muslim's apartment. However, it was soon discontinued one the Muslim moved abroad. In 1992, the prayer resumed at the other Muslims' house.

Mosque
The islands do not have an established Mosque, however, there are public halls set aside for worship and religious events. Because the Muslim population is so small (121 person or 0.17% out of population of 71,105), the community is more close-knit and will gather at a friend’s home for worship if there are no available halls. The Islamic Society of the Cayman Islands was also established to reach out to fellow Muslims in the country and provide a place for free and safe worship.

Notable Muslims
 Anwar Choudhury, Governor of the Cayman Islands (2018)

See also
 Demographics of the Cayman Islands

References

Demographics of the Cayman Islands
Cayman Islands
Cayman Islands